The Arizona State Sun Devils women's ice hockey team represents Arizona State University (ASU) in American Collegiate Hockey Association (ACHA) women's Division I competition as a member of the Western Women's Collegiate Hockey League (WWCHL). It plays its home games at Mullett Arena in Tempe, beginning in the 2022–23 season.

Lindsey Ellis has been the team's coach in each of the program's four years of existence, having grown up in nearby Peoria and coming back to Arizona to start the program after a successful career at Miami University that included an ACHA National Championship in 2014.

History

2016–17 
Arizona State University announced the addition of women's club ice hockey in August 2015, with play scheduled to begin the following season in August 2016. The team would play its home games at Oceanside Ice Arena, the same venue as the men's team and just miles from campus. Arizona native Lindsey Ellis would serve as the head coach. Ellis played four years of club hockey at Miami University and was an alternate captain for two seasons. In her junior season, 2013/14, Ellis and Miami won the national title, the same year ASU's DI men's ACHA team won the title, prompting the wheels to be put in motion for a women's team at ASU.

The team's inaugural leadership group was made up of captain KC McGinley and alternate captains Dannika Borges, Amber Galles and Taylor England.

ASU played its first season with a thin roster and a road-heavy schedule, with the first game in ASU's history taking place on Friday, October 7 in Boulder, a 5–1 loss to the University of Colorado. The first goal in program history was scored by Erin Rawls 14:08 into the first period on an assist from Dannika Borges.

Over the remainder of the regular season, the Sun Devils faced Colorado State University, Midland University, Lindenwood-Belleville, the University of Minnesota and the University of Wisconsin. While all of these games resulted in losses, the Midland games were close, both at scores of 3–1. After a 0–12 start, ASU's first wins as a program finally took place February 4, a 5–3 victory over the University of Denver that included its first ever hat trick, a three-goal effort from junior Amber Galles.

After ending the season with a 2–1 win over Denver, ASU prepped for the WWCHL tournament, having earned a bid by being the host team. All three games of the postseason tournament were losses, 4–0 to Lindenwood, 5–4 to Colorado State and 5–4 to Midland. The team finished 2–15 and placed seventh in their eight-team conference.

2017–18 
After a challenging inaugural season that saw the Sun Devils go 2–15,  the 2017/18 campaign was a season marked with significant improvement. While the roster was not any larger, with 10–12 skaters in any given game, the returners contributed more points than the previous season with key contributions from newcomers as well.

Goaltender Jordan Nash-Boulden was the lone net-minder for ASU all year long, playing 1,499 minutes and facing 1,000 shots for a save percentage of .921.  The team brought in a freshman class of three players, highlighted by Catherine Jones, who scored seven goals with seven assists for 14 points, good for 4th on the team.

The season began with two games against Grand Canyon University, marking the first meetings between the two teams in GCU's inaugural campaign. While the season's opener resulted in a tie, the Sun Devils stormed back the next night to take a 4–1 victory. Finishing off a stretch of six straight home games to open the season, the Devils dropped two games to Colorado, then two over Colorado State, ASU's first two wins over the CSU Rams in history.

After the wins over CSU, the team hit a rough patch, dropping six straight games between the WWCHL Showcase in Colorado and two home losses and Midland. One of these loses was a 1–0 shutout at the hands of GCU, marking the Lopes' first win not only over ASU but as a program. Arizona State rebounded against GCU in December, ending 2017 on a strong note, beating GCU twice on the road with  a 3–0 victory December 8 that was both Nash-Boulden's and the program's first shutouts.

ASU wrapped up its home-heavy regular season with two victories over Denver, clinching a berth to the WWCHL playoffs to be held at the end of February in Fremont, Nebraska. Before the postseason began, the Sun Devils hit the road for a non-conference weekend in Ohio, playing two games against head coach Lindsey Ellis' alma mater, Miami University and one against Ohio State.

Ahead of the postseason, Arizona State was ranked for the first time in program history, coming in at No. 15 in the ACHA weekly rankings for women's division 1. The season ended in Nebraska at Sidner Ice Arena, where the Sun Devils lost to Lindenwood-Belleville and Midland in the WWCHL tournament. The Sun Devils finished the season 8–15–1, the program's best mark and a conference record of 7–10–1 that positioned them fifth of the nine teams in the WWCHL.

2018–19 
Arizona State's 2018/19 season was drastically  different from seasons past, with the program's first large recruiting class and for the first time in team history, a full roster of 21 players. For the first four weeks of the season, the Sun Devils hovered between 12 and 14 in the ACHA rankings before dropping out for several weeks and reappearing at No. 15 later in the season.

For the second straight year, ASU began the season against Grand Canyon, continuing a cross-town rivalry that developed the previous season with a series split. With two games under her team's belt, head coach Lindsey Ellis chose to name four alternate captains, having waited until after the season began. Of the four, two were unique selections in the college hockey landscape, in a goaltender (Jordan Nash-Boulden) and a freshman (Kat Jones).

The Sun Devils then spent two weekends away from home, participating in the WWCHL showcase against Denver and Midland, in Colorado and a showcase in Springfield, Missouri, with games against  Concordia Ann Arbor, Aquinas and McKendree. For the first time in program history, ASU tied Midland, drawing 4–4 in overtime for its first non-loss against the Warriors. In Missouri, the Devils went 2–1, with their only loss coming to McKendree, a 5–0 deficit on Saturday, October 27. In the October 25th game against CUAA, freshman forward Kat Jones recorded the second hat trick in program history, scoring three goals in the 8–1 win. The next six games were a stretch against the three Colorado teams. ASU split a home series with Colorado State, lost two to Colorado and beat Denver twice before coming back home to split a home-and-home series with GCU.

When the calendar flipped to 2019, the Sun Devils wrapped up December with two losses to Minnesota, before taking a week off and bouncing back strong to wrap up the regular season with a sweep of GCU at home. On February 8, Kat Jones won the game with a shorthanded goal in overtime, the lone tally in a 1–0 victory.

To wrap up the season, ASU hosted the WWCHL conference tournament in Las Vegas at the Las Vegas Golden Knights' City National Arena. After a 3–1 loss to Colorado on February 22, the closest margin ever between the two teams, the Devils responded on February 23 with their first ever playoff win, a 4–0 victory over GCU to send the team into the semifinals for the first time in program history. While the season ended with a 3–0 loss to Midland late in the evening on the 23rd, the game not only marked the deepest playoff run in program history, but their 10-12-1 finish (.457 winning percentage) was the best in the young team's three seasons. 8-11-1 in conference play during the regular season was good for 3rd of the six teams in the WWCHL.

2019–20 
For the first six games of the season, Arizona State played without captains, but in mid-October, head coach Lindsey Ellis named sophomore Kat Jones the team's captain, while naming seniors Molly Potter and Jordan Nash-Boulden, as well as sophomore Danielle Dupont, the alternate captains. For the first time in program history, Arizona State spent the entire season in the rankings, moving between 12th and 13th in the ACHA all season. 

The Sun Devils opened up the 2019/20 season with 12 consecutive games on the road, including seven-game win streak to start the season with sweeps over Colorado State, Denver and cross-town rival Grand Canyon, as well as a win over Aquinas. After compiling a 2–1 record at a showcase in Springfield, Missouri, including a 13–0 win over Concordia Ann Arbor (the largest margin of victory in program history at the time) the team traveled to Michigan for the first time in program history with an 8-1 record to face Davenport, No. 3 Adrian and Michigan, winning over Davenport and Michigan. 

After an extended stretch on the road to begin the regular season, the team returned back home for the next six games, sweeping both league-newcomers Utah and cross-town rival Grand Canyon. The final two home games took place against No. 11 Colorado and for the first time in program history, the Sun Devils took the Buffaloes into overtime on February 7, only to fall 2-1. They returned to AZ Ice Arcadia on February 15 for a 3–2 win over GCU, securing a perfect 5-0 record against their cross-town rivals in the season, the first time they swept the Lopes across the season in program history. 

With a 13–4 record under their belts, the Sun Devils traveled up to Salt Lake City, Utah, for the 2020 WWCHL Playoffs and made quick work of CSU and host Utah with 4-1 and 3-1 wins, to advance to the conference championship game for the first time in program history, where they looked to topple the Colorado Buffaloes, also for the first time in program history. CU scored just over two minutes into the first period and ASU responded with a late first period goal from captain Kat Jones and held a tie through the second period and into the third. Colorado added four goals over the game's final 14 minutes and used a 5-1 score to win the title game and advance to the ACHA National tournament. 

While falling one win short of a berth to nationals, the Sun Devils still set many program records, including the most wins in a single season (17), the best winning percentage (.773), most goals scored (95) and fewest goals scored against (37).

2020–21 
Per university regulations, the 2020/21 season was canceled and the team did not play any ACHA games. They returned to competition in Fall 2021.

2021–22 
The 2021/22 season is currently ongoing.

Record vs Opponents

Season by season results

Program records

Career scoring leaders 

 Games: (94) Sheridan Gloyd, 2018/19 - 2022/23
 Goals: (44) Kat Jones, 2018/19 - 2021/22
 Assists: (35) Sheridan Gloyd, 2018/19 - 2022/23
 Points: (75) Kat Jones, 2018/19 - 2021/22
 Power Play Goals: (11) Kat Jones, 2018/19 - 2021/22
 Shorthanded Goals: (3) Kat Jones, 2018/19 - 2021/22 AND Hayley Martin, 2021/22 - 2022/23
 Game-Winning Goals: (36)  Kat Jones, 2018/19 - 2021/22 AND Sam Murphy, 2021/22 - 2022/23
 Penalty Minutes: (122) Dannika Borges, 2016/17 - 2017/18

Single season scoring leaders 

 Games: (24) 22 Tied
 Goals: (25) Sam Murphy, 2021/22
 Assists: (29) Sam Murphy, 2021/22
 Points: (45) Sam Murphy, 2021/22
 Points/Game: (2.25) Sam Murphy, 2021/22
 Power Play Goals: (7) Kat Jones, 2019/20
 Shorthanded Goals: (3) Hayley Martin, 2021/22
 Penalty Minutes: (66) Dannika Borges, 2016/17

Single game scoring leaders 

 Goals: Danielle Dupont, September 28, 2019 @ Colorado State (4)
 Assists: Alyssa Ayers, November 3, 2018 vs. Colorado State (4)
 Points: Danielle Dupont, September 28, 2019 @ Colorado State (5)
 Power Play Goals: Kat Jones, November 23, 2019 vs. Utah (2)
 Shorthanded Goals: 4 Tied (1)
 Penalty Minutes: Dannika Borges, February 5, 2017 vs. Denver (10)

ACHA Ranking History 

The top eight teams in the final ACHA ranking of the season receive an invitation to the ACHA National Tournament. In the 2016–17 and 2017–18 seasons, the ACHA tabulated rankings each week during the season and issued them on Tuesdays following weekends including games. Beginning in 2018–19, the ACHA switched to an entirely computerized system with again weekly rankings being released, albeit not always on Tuesdays.

Historical Notes

Goaltenders 
Four goalies have played for ASU Women's Hockey through the 2019/20 season, though Jordan Nash-Boulden has seen over 80% of the program's minutes.

Single game goaltender records 

 Goals allowed: Jordan Nash-Boulden (2x), Most recently February 10, 2018 @ Miami (10)
 Shots faced: Brianna Hersom, November 18, 2016 @ Lindenwood - Belleville (83)
 Saves: Brianna Hersom, November 18, 2016 @ Lindenwood - Belleville (77)

Hat Tricks 
Arizona State women’s hockey has seen six hat tricks recorded in program history, four of them coming during the 2019/20 season.

 Amber Galles: Saturday, February 4, 2017, vs. Denver (3 Goals)
 Kat Jones: Thursday, October 28, 2018, vs. Concordia-Ann Arbor (3 Goals)
 Danielle Dupont: Saturday, September 29, 2019, at Colorado State (4 Goals)
 Kat Jones: Friday, November 8, 2019, vs. Davenport (3 Goals)
 Kat Jones: Sunday, November 10, 2019, vs. Michigan (3 Goals)
Malak Rabuk: Saturday, November 23, 2019, vs. Utah (3 Goals)

Conference Honors 
Includes WWCHL all-conference from 2016/17, 2017/18, 2018/19 and 2019/20.

First Team All-WWCHL

KC McGinley (Defense) - 2016/17
KC McGinley (Defense) - 2017/18
Jordan Nash-Boulden (Goalie) - 2017/18
Alyssa Ayers (Forward) - 2018/19
Jordan Nash-Boulden (Goalie) - 2019/20
Danielle Dupont (Forward) - 2019/20

Second Team All-WWCHL

Taylor Northcott (Defense) - 2019/20

See also 
American Collegiate Hockey Association
Western Women's Collegiate Hockey League
Arizona State University

References

External links 

 Arizona State Women's Hockey (official site)

College women's ice hockey teams in the United States
Ice hockey teams in Arizona
American Collegiate Hockey Association
Women's sports in Arizona